Fabio Meduri (born 19 August 1991) is an Italian footballer who plays for A.C. Calvina Sport 1946 as a midfielder.

Club career
Medduri was transferred to Monza on 13 June.

He made his debut for the club on 18 August, in the Coppa Italia defeat against Sassuolo.

His debut in the Prima Divisione was on 5 September, in the big defeat against Hellas Verona.

Meduri was loaned to Foggia Calcio until the end of 2011-12 season. He then resumed his career in the lower leagues, representing Barletta, Cosenza and Savoia.

On 31 August 2015 he joined Ischia Isolaverde on a free transfer.

Meduri signed for Como 1907 on 4 October 2018.

Ahead of the 2019/20 season, Meduri joined A.C. Calvina Sport 1946.

References

External links
 
 

1991 births
Sportspeople from the Metropolitan City of Reggio Calabria
Living people
Italian footballers
Association football midfielders
Atalanta B.C. players
A.C. Monza players
A.C. Rodengo Saiano players
Calcio Foggia 1920 players
A.S.D. Barletta 1922 players
Cosenza Calcio players
A.C. Savoia 1908 players
F.C. Lumezzane V.G.Z. A.S.D. players
U.S. Triestina Calcio 1918 players
Como 1907 players
A.C. Ponte San Pietro Isola S.S.D. players
Serie C players
Serie D players
S.S. Ischia Isolaverde players
Footballers from Calabria